Zdeněk Zikán (10 November 1937 – 14 February 2013) was a Czech football player.

During his club career he played for several clubs, including Dukla Pardubice and Dukla Prague. During his time with Spartak Hradec Králové, he played in the 1960–61 European Cup, scoring against eventual finalists FC Barcelona in the quarter finals.

Zikán earned four caps and scored five goals for the Czechoslovakia national football team, including four goals in three games in the 1958 FIFA World Cup. He finished his international career with the distinction of having scored in every game in which he had played.

Career statistics

International goals

References

External links
 Profile at ČMFS website

1937 births
2013 deaths
Czech footballers
Czechoslovak footballers
Czechoslovakia international footballers
1958 FIFA World Cup players
Dukla Prague footballers
FC Hradec Králové players
Association football forwards
Footballers from Prague